The Freedom 28 Cat Ketch is an American sailboat that was designed by Gary Hoyt and Jay Paris, first built in 1979. The design is out of production.

The boat is sometimes confused with the similarly-named Freedom 28.

Production
The boat was built by Tillotson Pearson on behalf of Freedom Yachts in the United States, starting in 1979, but is now out of production.

Design
The Freedom 28 Cat Ketch is a small recreational keelboat, built predominantly of fiberglass. It has an unstayed cat ketch rig, a transom-hung rudder and a swing-up centerboard. It displaces  and carries  of lead ballast.

The spars are made from carbon fiber. The initial models were produced with wrap-around sleeve-type sails and wishbone booms, but these were later changed to more conventional sails and booms.

It also has a  water tank.

The boat has a PHRF racing average handicap of 204 with a high of 186 and low of 240.

See also
List of sailing boat types

References

Keelboats
1970s sailboat type designs
Sailing yachts
Sailboat type designs by Gary Hoyt
Sailboat type designs by Jay Paris
Sailboat types built by Pearson Yachts